Russell LaFayette Cecil (1881-1 June 1965),  was an American physician who edited the first Cecil Textbook of Medicine in 1927.

References

 

1881 births
1965 deaths
20th-century American physicians
American medical academics
American medical writers